Diana Huebert (born Josephine Campbell; 1899–1983), later Diana Huebert Faidy, was a Chicago modern dancer and advocate of the experimental humanities. She was first exposed to dancing through her father, who was a ballet teacher in Chicago. Although she was classically trained, she left Chicago to study experimental and avant-garde forms of "free" dancing, in the vein of Isadora Duncan. In Paris, she studied under Raymond Duncan, the brother of her idol, and then traveled throughout Europe seeing performances of modern dance. She became a member of the Chicago Gurdjieff group. She married architect Abel Faidy around 1939, and there is no record of any children from this marriage. Upon her return to the United States, she became a professional dancer, dance teacher, lecturer, and producer. She retired in 1969, four years after her husband Abel Faidy’s death. She spent her retirement attempting to memorialize the architectural and design work of her husband. She also wrote memoirs of her experiences with Georges Gurdjieff in the 1970s, which she submitted to the Gurdjieff Foundation. She died in Chicago.

References

External links
 Diana Huebert Papers at Newberry Library

1899 births
1983 deaths
American female dancers
Dancers from Illinois
People from Chicago
20th-century American dancers
20th-century American women